SBK-09: Superbike World Championship is a motorcycle racing game developed by Milestone srl and published by Black Bean Games for the PlayStation 2, PlayStation 3, PlayStation Portable, Windows, and Xbox 360 in 2009, the same platforms as its predecessor, SBK-08: Superbike World Championship.

Reception
SBK-09 received mixed reviews, with a Metacritic average of 71% on the PS3, and 70% on the Xbox 360.

IT Reviews praised the game's accessibility, and appeal to both novice and hardened racers. The site said that "the medium skill settings represent a suitably measured challenge to the average gamer, with reasonably realistic but not punishing bike physics. Crank it up to the top level, however, and the bike becomes very demanding, requiring a feel for proper braking and accelerating techniques."

Xbox World 360 magazine in the UK commented that SBK-09 was "Impressive - as long as you don't expect a massive evolution of last year's game."

IGN, however, disagreed and said that "SBK-09 is a flavourless affair with a personality like an R&B’ing Joaquin Phoenix. It feels very much like a game for sim-nuts."

References

Superbike World Championship video games
2009 video games
PlayStation 2 games
PlayStation 3 games
PlayStation Portable games
Windows games
Xbox 360 games
Video games developed in Italy
Multiplayer and single-player video games
Milestone srl games
Black Bean Games games